The Emanuel Lutheran Church of Montra is a historic church in Jackson Township, Shelby County, Ohio, United States. Located in the unincorporated community of Montra, north-northeast of the county seat of Sidney, it is the congregation's second building.

Montra was platted in 1849, but five years passed before any buildings were erected at the site. St. Emanuel's Lutheran Church was organized in a Montra storeroom in 1860 with a membership of sixteen families. Fire destroyed the building in 1874, leaving the congregation homeless for several months. A replacement church was erected on the site of the old during the summer of 1875. It was officially dedicated in October 1875. Built on a stone foundation, the white wooden building is topped with a steeple and features five windows on each side.

In 1982, Emanuel Lutheran Church was listed on the National Register of Historic Places as a property that had made significant contributions to American history. Today, Emanuel is an active congregation of the Evangelical Lutheran Church in America. According to the denomination's published statistics, the congregation had 190 members and an average Sunday worship attendance of 42 .

References

Churches completed in 1873
19th-century Lutheran churches in the United States
Religious organizations established in 1860
Lutheran churches in Ohio
Evangelical Lutheran Church in America
Churches on the National Register of Historic Places in Ohio
Buildings and structures in Shelby County, Ohio
National Register of Historic Places in Shelby County, Ohio
Wooden churches in Ohio
1860 establishments in Ohio